The Ministry of Public Works and Housing is a department of the Council of Ministers of the Syrian Arab Republic. It is based in Yusuf al-Azma Square, Damascus.

Responsibilities 
The ministry participates in planning of urban development affairs by drawing the general policy for sustainable urban planning and development, and preparing development plans and programs from the regional level to the local level. 

And in the affairs of housing and real estate development, by working to provide the basic ingredients for the development of the housing sector to produce real estate products that meet the needs of society through real estate development projects. 

As for public works affairs, it is through the implementation of construction projects in the administrative public sector agencies through the work of the public construction companies affiliated with the Ministry.

Ministers

See also 
 Government ministries of Syria

References 

Government ministries of Syria
Ministries established in 2016
2016 establishments in Syria
Housing in Syria
Public works ministries
Housing ministries
Organizations based in Damascus